A visa (from the Latin charta visa, meaning "paper that has been seen") is a conditional authorization granted by a polity to a foreigner that allows them to enter, remain within, or leave its territory. Visas typically include limits on the duration of the foreigner's stay, areas within the country they may enter, the dates they may enter, the number of permitted visits, or if the individual has the ability to work in the country in question. Visas are associated with the request for permission to enter a territory and thus are, in most countries, distinct from actual formal permission for an alien to enter and remain in the country. In each instance, a visa is subject to entry permission by an immigration official at the time of actual entry and can be revoked at any time. Visa evidence most commonly takes the form of a sticker endorsed in the applicant's passport or other travel document but may also exist electronically. Some countries no longer issue physical visa evidence, instead recording details only in immigration databases.

Historically, immigration officials were empowered to permit or reject entry of visitors on arrival at the frontiers. If permitted entry, the official would issue a visa, when required, which would be a stamp in a passport. Today, travellers wishing to enter another country must often apply in advance for what is also called a visa, sometimes in person at a consular office, by post, or over the Internet. The modern visa may be a sticker or a stamp in the passport, an electronic record of the authorization, or a separate document which the applicant can print before entering and produce on entry to the visited polity. Some countries do not require visitors to apply for a visa in advance for short visits.

Visa applications in advance of arrival give countries a chance to consider the applicant's circumstances, such as financial security, reason for travel, and details of previous visits to the country. Visitors may also be required to undergo and pass security or health checks upon arrival at the port of entry.

Some polities which restrict emigration require individuals to possess an exit visa to leave the polity. These exit visas may be required for citizens, foreigners, or both, depending on the policies of the polity concerned. Unlike ordinary visas, exit visas are often seen as an illegitimate intrusion on individuals' right to freedom of movement. Imposition of an exit visa requirement may be seen to violate customary international law, as the right to leave any country is provided for in the Universal Declaration of Human Rights.

Uniquely, the Norwegian special territory of Svalbard is an entirely visa-free zone under the terms of the Svalbard Treaty.
Some countries—such as those in the Schengen Area—have agreements with other countries allowing each other's citizens to travel between them without visas. The World Tourism Organization announced that the number of tourists requiring a visa before travelling was at its lowest level ever in 2015.

History

In western Europe in the late 19th century and early 20th century, passports and visas were not generally necessary for moving from one country to another. The relatively high speed and large movements of people travelling by train would have caused bottlenecks if regular passport controls had been used. Passports and visas became usually necessary as travel documents only after World War I.

Hitherto, passports and visas were usually the same type of travel documents. In the modern world, visas have become separate secondary travel documents, with passports acting as the primary travel documents.

Conditions of issue
Some visas can be granted on arrival or by prior application at the country's embassy or consulate, or through a private visa service specialist who is specialized in the issuance of international travel documents. These agencies are authorized by the foreign authority, embassy, or consulate to represent international travellers who are unable or unwilling to travel to the embassy and apply in person. Private visa and passport services collect an additional fee for verifying customer applications, supporting documents, and submitting them to the appropriate authority. If there is no embassy or consulate in one's home country, then one would have to travel to a third country (or apply by post) and try to get a visa issued there. Alternatively, in such cases visas may be pre-arranged for collection on arrival at the border. The need or absence of need of a visa generally depends on the citizenship of the applicant, the intended duration of the stay, and the activities that the applicant may wish to undertake in the country he or she visits; these may delineate different formal categories of visas, with different issue conditions.

The issuing authority, usually a branch of the country's foreign ministry or department (e.g. U.S. State Department), and typically consular affairs officers, may request appropriate documentation from the applicant. This may include proof that the applicant is able to support him or herself in the host country (lodging, food), proof that the person hosting the applicant in his or her home really exists and has sufficient room for hosting the applicant, proof that the applicant has obtained health and evacuation insurance, etc. Some countries ask for proof of health status, especially for long-term visas; some countries deny such visas to persons with certain illnesses, such as AIDS. The exact conditions depend on the country and category of visa. Notable examples of countries requiring HIV tests of long-term residents are Russia and Uzbekistan. In Uzbekistan, however, the HIV test requirement is sometimes not strictly enforced. Other countries require a medical test that includes an HIV test, even for a short-term tourism visa. For example, Cuban citizens and international exchange students require such a test approved by a medical authority to enter Chilean territory.

The issuing authority may also require applicants to attest that they have no criminal convictions, or that they do not participate in certain activities (like prostitution or drug trafficking). Some countries will deny visas if passports show evidence of citizenship of, or travel to, a country that is considered hostile by that country. For example, some Arabic-oriented countries will not issue visas to nationals of Israel and those whose passports bear evidence of visiting Israel.

Many countries frequently demand strong evidence of intent to return to the home country, if the visa is for a temporary stay, due to potential unwanted illegal immigration. Proof of ties to the visa applicant's country of residence is often demanded to demonstrate a sufficient incentive to return. This can include things such as documented evidence of employment, bank statements, property ownership, and family ties.

Types

Each country typically has a multitude of categories of visas with various names. The most common types and names of visas include:

By purpose

Transit visas
For passing through the country of issue to a destination outside that country. Validity of transit visas are usually limited by short terms such as several hours to ten days depending on the size of the country or the circumstances of a particular transit itinerary.
 Airside transit visa, required by some countries for passing through their airports even without going through passport control.
 Crew member, steward, or driver visa, issued to persons employed or trained on aircraft, vessels, trains, trucks, buses, and any other means of international transportation, or ships fishing in international waters.

Short-stay or visitor visas
For short visits to the visited country. Many countries differentiate between different reasons for these visits, such as:
 Private visa, for private visits by invitation from residents of the visited country.
 Tourist visa, for a limited period of leisure travel, no business activities allowed.
 Medical visa, for undertaking diagnostics or a course of treatment in the visited country's hospitals or other medical facilities.
 Business visa, for engaging in commerce in the country. These visas generally preclude permanent employment, for which a work visa would be required.
 Working holiday visa, for individuals travelling between nations offering a working holiday program, allowing young people to undertake temporary work while travelling.
 Athletic or artistic visa, issued to athletes and performing artists (and their supporting staff) performing at competitions, concerts, shows, and other events.
 Cultural exchange visa, usually issued to athletes and performing artists participating in a cultural exchange program.
 Refugee visa, issued to persons fleeing the dangers of persecution, a war or a natural disaster.
 Pilgrimage visa: this type of visa is mainly issued to those intending to visit religious destinations and/or to take part in particular religious ceremonies. Such visas can usually be obtained relatively quickly and at a low cost; those using them are usually permitted to travel only as a group, however. The most well-known example is Saudi Arabia's Hajj visa.
 Digital nomad visa, for digital nomads who want to temporarily reside in a country while performing remote work. Thailand launched its SMART Visa, targeted at high expertise foreigners and entrepreneurs to stay a longer time in Thailand, with online applications for the visa being planned for late 2018. Estonia has also announced plans for a digital nomad visa, after the launch of its e-Residency program.

Long-stay visas
Visas valid for long term stays of a specific duration include:
 Student visa (F-1 in the United States), which allows its holder to study at an institution of higher learning in the issuing country. The F-2 visa allows the student's dependents to accompany them in the United States.
 Research visa, for students doing fieldwork in the host country.
 Temporary worker visa, for approved employment in the host country. These are generally more difficult to obtain but valid for longer periods of time than a business visa. Examples of these are the United States' H-1B and L-1 visas. Depending on a particular country, the status of temporary worker may or may not evolve into the status of permanent resident or to naturalization.
 Journalist visa, which some countries require of people in that occupation when travelling for their respective news organizations. Countries that insist on this include Cuba, China, Iran, Japan, North Korea, Saudi Arabia, the United States (I-visa), and Zimbabwe.
 Residence visa, granted to people obtaining long-term residence in the host country. In some countries, such as New Zealand, long-term residence is a necessary step to obtain the status of a permanent resident.
 Asylum visa, issued to people who have suffered or reasonably fear persecution in their own country due to their political activities or opinion, or features, or association with a social group; or were exiled from their own country.
 Dependent visa, issued to certain family members of holder of a long-stay visa of certain other types (e.g., to spouse and children of a qualified employee holding a temporary worker visa).

Immigrant visas

Granted for those intending to settle permanently in the issuing country (obtain the status of a permanent resident with a prospect of possible naturalization in the future):
 Spouse visa or partner visa, granted to the spouse, civil partner or de facto partner of a resident or citizen of a given country to enable the couple to settle in that country.
 Family member visa, for other members of the family of a resident or citizen of a given country. Usually, only the closest ones are covered:
 Parents, often restricted to helpless ones, i.e. those who, due to their elderly age or state of health, need supervision and care;
 Children (including adopted ones), often restricted to those who have not reached the age of maturity or helpless ones;
 Often also extended to grandchildren or grandparents, where their immediate parents or children, respectively, are for whichever reason unable to take care of them;
 Often also extended to helpless siblings.
 Marriage visa, granted for a limited period before intended marriage or conclusion of a civil partnership based on a proven relationship with a citizen of the destination country. For example, a German woman wishing to marry an American man would obtain a Fiancée Visa (also known as a K-1 visa) to allow her to enter the United States. A K1 Fiancée Visa is valid for four months from the date of its approval.
 Pensioner visa (also known as retiree visa or retirement visa), issued by a limited number of countries (Australia, Argentina, Thailand, Panama, etc.), to those who can demonstrate a foreign source of income and who do not intend to work in the issuing country. Age limits apply in some cases.

Official visas
These are granted to officials doing jobs for their governments, or otherwise representing their countries in the host country, such as the personnel of diplomatic missions.
 A diplomatic visa in combination with a regular or diplomatic passport.
 Courtesy visas are issued to representatives of foreign governments or international organizations who do not qualify for diplomatic status but do merit expedited, courteous treatment – an example of this is Australia's special purpose visa.

By method of issue
Normally visa applications are made at and collected from a consulate, embassy, or other diplomatic mission.

On-arrival visas

Also known as visas on arrival (VOA), they are granted at a port of entry. This is distinct from visa-free entry, where no visa is required, as the visitor must still obtain the visa on arrival before proceeding to immigration control.

 Almost all countries will consider issuing a visa (or another document to the same effect) on arrival to a visitor arriving in unforeseen exceptional circumstances, for example:
 Under provisions of article 35 of the Schengen Visa Code, a visa may be issued at a border in situations such as the diversion of a flight causing air passengers in transit to pass through two or more airports instead of one. In 2010, Iceland's Eyjafjallajökull volcano erupted, causing significant disruption of air travel throughout Europe, and the EU responded by announcing that it would issue visas at land borders to stranded travellers.
 Under section 212(d)(4) of the Immigration and Naturalization Act, visa waivers can be issued to travellers arriving at American ports of entry in emergency situations or under other conditions.
 Certain international airports in Russia have consuls on-duty, who have the power to issue visas on the spot.
 Some countries issue visas on arrival to special categories of travellers, such as seafarers or aircrew.
 Some countries issue them to regular visitors; there often are restrictions, for example:
  issues visas on arrival in Minsk international airport only to nationals of countries where there is no consular representation of Belarus.
  only issues visas on arrival at certain border checkpoints. The most notable crossing where visas on arrival are not issued is the Padang Besar checkpoint for passenger trains between Malaysia and Thailand.

Electronic visas

An electronic visa (e-Visa or eVisa) is stored in a computer and is linked to the passport number so no label, sticker, or stamp is placed in the passport before travel. The application is done over the internet, and the receipt acts as a visa, which can be printed or stored on a mobile device.

Entry and duration period
Visas can also be single-entry, which means the visa is cancelled as soon as the holder leaves the country; double-entry, or multiple-entry, which permits double or multiple entries into the country with the same visa. Countries may also issue re-entry permits that allow temporarily leaving the country without invalidating the visa. Even a business visa will normally not allow the holder to work in the host country without an additional work permit.

Once issued, a visa will typically have to be used within a certain period of time.

In some countries, the validity of a visa is not the same as the authorized period of stay. The visa validity then indicates the time period when the entry is permitted into the country. For example, if a visa has been issued to begin on 1 January and to expire on 30 March, and the typical authorized period of stay in a country is 90 days, then the 90-day authorized stay starts on the day the passenger enters the country (entrance has to be between 1 January and 30 March). Thus, the latest day the traveller could conceivably stay in the issuing country is 1 July (if the traveller entered on 30 March). This interpretation of visas is common in the Americas.

With other countries, a person may not stay beyond the period of validity of their visa, which is usually set within the period of validity of their passport. The visa may also limit the total number of days the visitor may spend in the applicable territory within the period of validity. This interpretation of visa periods is common in Europe.

Once in the country, the validity period of a visa or authorized stay can often be extended for a fee at the discretion of immigration authorities. Overstaying a period of authorized stay given by the immigration officers is considered illegal immigration even if the visa validity period is not over (i.e., for multiple entry visas) and a form of being "out of status" and the offender may be fined, prosecuted, deported, or even blacklisted from entering the country again.

Entering a country without a valid visa or visa exemption may result in detention and removal (deportation or exclusion) from the country. Undertaking activities that are not authorized by the status of entry (for example, working while possessing a non-worker tourist status) can result in the individual being deemed liable for deportation—commonly referred to as an illegal alien. Such violation is not a violation of a visa, despite the common misuse of the phrase, but a violation of status; hence the term "out of status".

Even having a visa does not guarantee entry to the host country. The border crossing authorities make the final determination to allow entry, and may even cancel a visa at the border if the alien cannot demonstrate to their satisfaction that they will abide by the status their visa grants them.

Some countries that do not require visas for short stays may require a long-stay visa for those who intend to apply for a residence permit. For example, the EU does not require a visa of citizens of many countries for stays under 90 days, but its member states require a long-stay visa of such citizens for longer stays.

Visa extensions
Many countries have a mechanism to allow the holder of a visa to apply to extend a visa. In Denmark, a visa holder can apply to the Danish Immigration Service for a Residence Permit after they have arrived in the country. In the United Kingdom, applications can be made to UK Visas and Immigration.

In certain circumstances, it is impossible for the holder of the visa to do this, either because the country does not have a mechanism to prolong visas or, most likely, because the holder of the visa is using a short stay visa to live in a country.

Visa run

Some foreign visitors sometimes engage in what is known as a visa run: leaving a country—usually to a neighboring country—for a short period just before the permitted length of stay expires, then returning to the first country to get a new entry stamp in order to extend their stay ("reset the clock"). Despite the name, a visa run is usually done with a passport that can be used for entry without a visa.

Visa runs are frowned upon by immigration authorities as such acts may signify that the foreigner wishes to reside permanently and might also work in that country; purposes that visitors are prohibited from engaging in and usually require an immigrant visa or a work visa. Immigration officers may deny re-entry to visitors suspected of engaging in prohibited activities, especially when they have done repeated visa runs and have no evidence of spending reasonable time in their home countries or countries where they have the right to reside and work.

To combat visa runs, some countries have limits on how long visitors can spend in the country without a visa, as well as how much time they have to stay out before "resetting the clock". For example, Schengen countries impose a maximum limit for visitors of 90 days in any 180-day period. Some countries do not "reset the clock" when a visitor comes back after visiting a neighboring country. For example, the United States does not give visitors a new period of stay when they come back from visiting Canada, Mexico, or the Caribbean; instead they are readmitted to the United States for the remaining days granted on their initial entry. Some other countries, e.g. Thailand, allow visitors who arrive by land from neighboring countries a shorter length of stay than those who arrive by air.

In some cases, a visa run is necessary to activate new visas or change the immigration status of a person. An example would be leaving a country and then returning immediately to activate a newly issued work visa before a person can legally work.

Visa refusal
In general, an applicant may be refused a visa if they do not meet the requirements for admission or entry under that country's immigration laws. More specifically, a visa may be denied or refused when the applicant:
 has committed fraud, deception, or misrepresentation in his or her current application as well as in a previous application
 has obtained a criminal record, has been arrested, or has criminal charges pending
 is considered to be a threat to national security
 does not have a good moral character
 has previous visa/immigration violations (even if the violations did not happen in the country the applicant is seeking a visa for)
 had their previous visa application(s) or application for immigration benefits refused and cannot prove that the reasons for the previous refusals no longer exist or are not applicable any more (even if the refusals did not previously happen in the country the applicant is seeking a visa for)
 cannot prove to have strong ties to their current country of nationality or residence (for those who are applying for temporary or non-immigrant visas)
 intends to reside or work permanently in the country she/he will visit if not applying for an immigrant or work visa respectively
 fails to demonstrate intent to return (for non-immigrants)
 fails to provide sufficient evidence/documents to prove eligibility for the visa sought after
 does not have a legitimate reason for the journey
 does not have adequate means of financial support for themselves or family
 does not have adequate medical insurance, especially if engaging in high risk activities (e.g. rock climbing, skiing, etc.)
 does not have travel arrangements (i.e. transport and lodging) in the destination country
 does not have health/travel insurance valid for the destination and the duration of stay
 is a citizen of a country to which the destination country is hostile or at war with
 has previously visited, or intends to visit, a country to which the destination country is hostile
 has a communicable disease, such as tuberculosis or ebola, or a sexually transmitted disease
 has a passport that expires too soon

Even if a traveller does not need a visa, the aforementioned criteria can also be used by border control officials to refuse the traveller's entry into the country in question.

Visa policies
The main reasons states impose visa restrictions on foreign nationals are to curb illegal immigration, security concerns, and reciprocity for visa restrictions imposed on their own nationals. Typically, nations impose visa restrictions on citizens of poorer countries, along with politically unstable and undemocratic ones, as it is considered more likely that people from these countries will seek to illegally immigrate. Visa restrictions may also be imposed when nationals of another country are perceived as likelier to be terrorists or criminals, or by autocratic regimes that perceive foreign influence to be a threat to their rule. According to Professor Eric Neumayer of the London School of Economics:

The poorer, the less democratic, and the more exposed to armed political conflict the target country is, the more likely that visa restrictions are in place against its passport holders. The same is true for countries whose nationals have been major perpetrators of terrorist acts in the past.

Some countries apply the principle of reciprocity in their visa policy. A country's visa policy is called 'reciprocal' if it imposes visa requirement against citizens of all the countries that impose visa requirements against its own citizens. The opposite is rarely true: a country rarely lifts visa requirements against citizens of all the countries that also lift visa requirements against its own citizens, unless a prior bilateral agreement has been made.

A fee may be charged for issuing a visa; these are often also reciprocal—hence, if country A charges country B's citizens US$50 for a visa, country B will often also charge the same amount for country A's visitors. The fee charged may also be at the discretion of each embassy. A similar reciprocity often applies to the duration of the visa (the period in which one is permitted to request entry of the country) and the number of entries one can attempt with the visa. Other restrictions, such as requiring fingerprints and photographs, may also be reciprocated. Expedited processing of the visa application for some countries will generally incur additional charges.

Government authorities usually impose administrative entry restrictions on foreign citizens in three ways - countries whose nationals may enter without a visa, countries whose nationals may obtain a visa on arrival, and countries whose nationals require a visa in advance. Nationals who require a visa in advance are usually advised to obtain them at a diplomatic mission of their destination country. Several countries allow nationals of countries that require a visa to obtain them online.

The following table lists visa policies of all countries by the number of foreign nationalities that may enter that country for tourism without a visa or by obtaining a visa on arrival with normal passport. It also notes countries that issue electronic visas to certain nationalities. Symbol "+" indicates a country that limits the visa-free regime negatively by only listing nationals who require a visa, thus the number represents the number of UN member states reduced by the number of nationals who require a visa and "+" stands for all possible non-UN member state nationals that might also not require a visa. "N/A" indicates countries that have contradictory information on its official websites or information supplied by the Government to IATA. Some countries that allow visa on arrival do so only at a limited number of entry points. Some countries such as the European Union member states have a qualitatively different visa regime between each other as it also includes freedom of movement.

The following table is current . Source:

Visa exemption agreements
Possession of a valid visa is a condition for entry into many countries, and exemption schemes exist. In some cases visa-free entry may be granted to holders of diplomatic passports even as visas are required by normal passport holders (see: Passport).

Some countries have reciprocal agreements such that a visa is not needed under certain conditions, e.g., when the visit is for tourism and for a relatively short period. Such reciprocal agreements may stem from common membership in international organizations or a shared heritage:
 All citizens of European Union (EU) and EFTA member countries can travel to and stay in all other EU and EFTA countries without a visa. See Four Freedoms (European Union) and Citizenship of the European Union.
 British and Irish citizens are entitled the right to travel to and stay in each other's countries without visas or restrictions under the Common Travel Area.
 Citizens of countries in the Common Travel Area (CTA) do not need visas to travel to and stay in other countries in the CTA.
 The United States Visa Waiver Program allows citizens of 38 countries to travel to the United States without a visa (although a pre-trip entry permission, ESTA, is needed).
 Citizens of Canada and the United States do not require a visa to travel between the two countries. Historically, verbal declaration of citizenship, or, if requested by an officer, the presentation of one of over 8,000 different types of documents indicating US or Canadian citizenship was sufficient in order to cross the border. Since the Western Hemisphere Travel Initiative came into effect in 2009, a passport, border crossing card, or enhanced driver's license is now required in order to enter the US from Canada by land, or a passport by air.
 Any Gulf Cooperation Council (GCC) citizen can enter and stay as long as required in any other GCC member state.
 All citizens of members of the Economic Community of West African States (ECOWAS), excluding those defined by law as undesirable aliens, may enter and stay without a visa in any member state for a maximum period of 90 days. The only requirement is a valid travel document and international vaccination certificates.
 Nationals of the East African Community member states do not need visas for entry into any of the member states.
 Some countries in the Commonwealth do not require tourist visas of citizens of other Commonwealth countries.
 Citizens of member states of the Association of Southeast Asian Nations do not require tourist visas to visit another member state, with the exception of Malaysia and Myanmar; both countries require citizens of the other country to have an eVisa to visit. Until 2009, Burmese citizens were required to have visas to enter all other ASEAN countries. Following the implementation of visa exemption agreements with the other ASEAN countries, in 2016 Burmese citizens are only required to have visas to enter Malaysia.
 Commonwealth of Independent States (CIS) member states mutually allow their citizens to enter visa-free, at least for short stays. There are exceptions between Tajikistan and Uzbekistan, and between Armenia and Azerbaijan.
 Nepal and India allow their citizens to enter, live, and work in each other's countries due to the Indo-Nepal friendship treaty of 1951. Indians do not require a visa or passport to travel to Bhutan and are only required to obtain passes at the border checkpoints, whilst Bhutan nationals holding a valid Bhutanese passport are authorized to enter India without a visa.
 Citizens of Mercosur full member and associate countries can enter without a visa in any of the member and associate countries, just needing to present the ID card.

Other countries may unilaterally grant visa-free entry to nationals of certain countries to facilitate tourism, promote business, or even to cut expenses on maintaining consular posts abroad.

Some of the considerations for a country to grant visa-free entry to another country include (but are not limited to):
 being a low security risk for the country potentially granting visa-free entry
 diplomatic relationship between two countries
 conditions in the visitor's home country as compared to the host country
 having a low risk of overstaying or violating visa terms in the country potentially granting visa-free entry

To have a smaller worldwide diplomatic staff, some countries rely on other country's (or countries') judgments when issuing visas. For example, Mexico allows citizens of all countries to enter without Mexican visas if they possess a valid American visa that has already been used. Costa Rica accepts valid visas of Schengen/EU countries, Canada, Japan, South Korea, and the United States (if valid for at least 3 months on date of arrival). The ultimate example of such reliance is Andorra, which imposes no visa requirements of its own because it has no international airport and is inaccessible by land without passing through the territory of either France or Spain and is thus "protected" by the Schengen visa system.

Visa-free travel between countries also occurs in all cases where passports (or passport-replacing documents such as laissez-passer) are not needed for such travel. (For examples of passport-free travel, see International travel without passports.)

As of 2019, the Henley & Partners passport index ranks the Japanese, Singaporean, and South Korean passports as the ones with the most visa exemptions by other nations, allowing holders of those passports to visit 189 countries without obtaining a visa in advance of arrival.
However,  the Passport Index ranks the United Arab Emirates passport as the one with the most visa exemptions by other nations, allowing holders of this passport to visit 173 countries without obtaining a visa in advance of arrival.

Common visas
Normally, visas are valid for entry only into the country that issued the visa. Countries that are members of regional organizations or party to regional agreements may, however, issue visas valid for entry into some or all of the member states of the organization or agreement:
 The Schengen Visa is a visa for the Schengen Area, which consists of most of the European Economic Area, plus several other adjacent countries. The visa allows visitors to stay in the Schengen Area for up to 90 days within a 180-day period. The visa is valid for tourism, family visits, and business.
 The Central American Single Visa (Visa Única Centroamericana) is a visa for Guatemala, El Salvador, Honduras, and Nicaragua. It was implemented by the CA-4 agreement. It allows citizens of those four countries free access to other member countries. It also allows visitors to any member country to enter another member country without having to obtain another visa.

Possible common visa schemes
Potentially, there are new common visa schemes:
 An ASEAN common visa scheme has been considered with Thailand and the "CLMV" countries of Cambodia, Laos, Myanmar, and Vietnam opting in earlier. After talk arose of a CLMV common visa, with Thailand being omitted, Thailand initiated and began implementation of a trial common visa with Cambodia, but cited security risks as the major hurdle. The trial run was delayed, but Thailand implemented a single visa scheme with Cambodia beginning on 27 December 2012 on a trial basis.
 A Gulf Cooperation Council single visa has been recommended as a study submitted to the council.
 The Pacific Alliance, which currently consists of Chile, Colombia, Mexico, and Peru, offer a common visa for tourism purposes only in order to make it easier for nationals from countries outside of the alliance to travel through these countries by not having to apply for multiple visas.
 An East African Single Tourist Visa is under consideration by the relevant sectoral authorities under the East African Community (EAC) integration program. If approved the visa will be valid for all five partner states in the EAC (Kenya, Tanzania, Uganda, Rwanda, and Burundi). Under the proposal for the visa, any new East African single visa can be issued by any partner state's embassy. The visa proposal followed an appeal by the tourist boards of the partner states for a common visa to accelerate promotion of the region as a single tourist destination and the EAC Secretariat wants it approved before November's World Travel Fair (or World Travel Market) in London. When approved by the East African council of ministers, tourists could apply for one country's entry visa, which would then be applicable in all regional member states as a single entry requirement initiative. This is considered also by COMESA.
 The SADC UNIVISA (or Univisa) has been in development since Southern African Development Community (SADC) members signed a Protocol on the Development of Tourism in 1998. The Protocol outlined the Univisa as an objective so as to enable the international and regional entry and travel of visitors to occur as smoothly as possible. It was expected to become operational by the end of 2002. Its introduction was delayed and a new implementation date, the end of 2006, was announced. The univisa was originally intended to only be available, initially, to visitors from selected "source markets" including Australia, the Benelux countries, France, Germany, Italy, Japan, Portugal, Spain, the United Kingdom, and the United States. It is now expected that when the Univisa is implemented, it will apply to non-SADC international (long-haul) tourists travelling to and within the region and that it will encourage multi - destination travel within the region. It is also anticipated that the Univisa will enlarge tourist market for transfrontier parks by lowering the boundaries between neighbouring countries in the parks. The visa is expected to be valid for all the countries with trans frontier parks (Botswana, Lesotho, Mozambique, Namibia, South Africa, and Zimbabwe) and some other SADC countries (Angola and Swaziland). As of 2017, universal visa is implemented by Zambia and Zimbabwe. Nationals of 65 countries and territories are eligible for visa on arrival that is valid for both countries. This visa is branded KAZA Uni-visa programme after Kavango–Zambezi Transfrontier Conservation Area (KAZA). It is expected that other SADC countries will join the program in the future.

Previous common visa schemes
These schemes no longer operate.
 The CARICOM Visa was introduced in late 2006 and allowed visitors to travel between 10 CARICOM member states (Antigua & Barbuda, Barbados, Dominica, Grenada, Guyana, Jamaica, St. Kitts & Nevis, St. Lucia, St. Vincent & the Grenadines, and Trinidad and Tobago). These ten member countries had agreed to form a "Single Domestic Space" in which travellers would only have their passport stamped and have to submit completed, standardized entry and departure forms at the first port and country of entry. The CARICOM Visa was applicable to the nationals of all countries except CARICOM member states (other than Haiti) and associate member states, Canada, France, Germany, Ireland, Italy, Japan, the Netherlands, South Africa, the United Kingdom, the United States of America, and the overseas countries, territories, or departments of these countries. The CARICOM Visa could be obtained from the Embassies/Consulates of Barbados, Jamaica, and Trinidad & Tobago and in countries that have no CARICOM representatives, the applications forms could be obtained from the embassies and consulates of the United Kingdom. The common visa was only intended for the duration of the 2007 Cricket World Cup and was discontinued on May 15, 2007. Discussions are ongoing into instituting a revised CARICOM visa on a permanent basis in the future.
 A predecessor of the Schengen common visa was the Benelux visa. Visas issued by Belgium, Netherlands, and Luxembourg were valid for all the three countries.

Exit visas

Exit visas may be required to leave some countries. Many countries limit the ability of individuals to leave in certain circumstances, such as those with outstanding legal proceedings or large government debts. Despite this, the term exit visa is generally limited to countries that systematically restrict departure, where the right to leave is not automatic. Imposing a systematic requirement for exit permission may be seen to violate the right to freedom of movement, which is found in the UDHR and forms part of customary international law.

Countries implementing exit visas vary in who they require to obtain one. Some countries permit the free movement of foreign nationals while restricting their own citizens. Others may limit the exit visa requirement to resident foreigners in the country on work visas, such as in the Kafala system.

Asia
Iraq, Kuwait, Lebanon, Oman, Saudi Arabia, and the United Arab Emirates all have an exit visa requirement for alien foreign workers. This is part of their kafala work visa sponsorship system. Consequently, at the end of a foreign worker's employment period, the worker must secure clearance from their employer stating that the worker has satisfactorily fulfilled the terms of their employment contract or that the worker's services are no longer needed. The exit visa can also be withheld if there are pending court charges that need to be settled or penalties that have to be meted out. In September 2018, Qatar lifted the exit visa requirement for most workers. Persons are generally free to leave Israel, except for those who are subject to a stay of exit order.

Nepal requires its citizens emigrating to the United States on an H-1B visa to present an exit permit issued by the Nepali Ministry of Labour. This document is called a work permit and needs to be presented to Nepali immigration to leave Nepal.

Uzbekistan was the last remaining country of the former USSR that required an exit visa, which was valid for a two-year period. The practice was abolished in 2019. There had been explicit United Nations complaint about this practice.

North Korea requires that its citizens obtain an exit visa stating the traveller's destination country and time to be spent abroad before leaving the country. Additionally, North Korean authorities also require North Korean citizens to obtain a re-entry visa from a North Korean embassy or North Korean mission abroad before being allowed back into North Korea.

The government of the People's Republic of China requires its citizens to obtain a two-way permit (visiting), or one-way permit (emigrating) issued by the People's Republic of China's authorities, prior to visiting Hong Kong or Macau. The two-way permit and one-way permit are a de facto exit visa for Hong Kong- or Macau-bound trips for citizens of the People's Republic of China.

Singapore operates an Exit Permit scheme in order to enforce the national service obligations of its male citizens and permanent residents. Requirements vary according to age and status:

Taiwan and South Korea also require male citizens who are older than a certain age but have not fulfilled their military duties to register with local Military Manpower Administration office before they pursue international travels, studies, business trips, and/or performances. Failure to do so is a felony in those countries and violators would face up to 3 years of imprisonment.

Europe
During the Fascist period in Italy, an exit visa was required from 1922 to 1943. Nazi Germany required exit visas from 1933 to 1945.

The Soviet Union and its Warsaw Pact allies required exit visas both for emigration and for those who wanted to leave the Soviet Union for a shorter period.

Some countries, including the Czech Republic, require that an alien who needs a visa on entry be in possession of a valid visa upon exit. To satisfy this formal requirement, exit visas sometimes need to be issued.

Russia requires an exit visa if a visitor stays past the expiration date of their visa. They must then extend their visa or apply for an exit visa and are not allowed to leave the country until they show a valid visa or have a permissible excuse for overstaying their visa (e.g., a note from a doctor or a hospital explaining an illness, missed flight, lost or stolen visa). In some cases, the Ministry of Foreign Affairs can issue a return-Home certificate that is valid for ten days from the embassy of the visitor's native country, thus eliminating the need for an exit visa.

A foreign citizen granted a temporary residence permit in Russia needs a temporary resident visa to take a trip abroad (valid for both exit and return). It is also colloquially called an exit visa. Not all foreign citizens are subject to that requirement. Citizens of Germany, for example, do not require this exit visa.

In March 2021, during the COVID-19 pandemic, the United Kingdom required everyone leaving England to fill out an exit form detailing their address, passport number, destination, and reason to travel. Permitted reasons to travel included for work or volunteering, education, medical or compassionate reasons such as weddings and funerals. Travellers may be required to carry evidence to support their reason to travel.

Americas
The government of Cuba announced in October 2012 its plans to remove exit visa requirements effective 14 January 2013, albeit with some exceptions.

Guatemala requires any foreigner who is a permanent resident to apply for a multiple 5-year exit visa.

United States
The United States of America does not require exit visas. Since 1 October 2007, however, the U.S. government requires all foreign and U.S. nationals departing the United States by air to hold a valid passport (or certain specific passport-replacing documents). Even though travellers might not require a passport to enter a certain country, they will require a valid passport booklet (booklet only, U.S. Passport Card not accepted) to depart the United States in order to satisfy the U.S. immigration authorities. Exemptions to this requirement to hold a valid passport include:

U.S. Permanent Resident/Resident Alien Card (Form I-551);
U.S. Military ID Cards when travelling on official orders;
U.S. Merchant Mariner Card;
NEXUS Card;
U.S. travel document:
Refugee Travel Document (Form I-571); or
Permit to Re-Enter (Form I-327)
Emergency Travel Document (e.g. Consular Letter) issued by a foreign embassy or consulate specifically for the purpose of travel to the bearer's home country.
Nationals of Mexico holding one of the following documents:
(expired) "Matricula Consular"; or
Birth certificate with consular registration; or
Certificate of Nationality issued by a Mexican consulate abroad; or
Certificate of Military Duty (Cartilla Militar); or
Voter's Certificate (Credencial IFE or Credencial para Votar).

In addition, green card holders and certain other aliens must obtain a certificate of compliance (also known as a "sailing permit" or "departure permit") from the Internal Revenue Service proving that they are up-to-date with their US income tax obligations before they may leave the country. While the requirement has been in effect since 1921, it has not been stringently enforced, but in 2014 the House Ways and Means Committee has considered beginning to enforce the requirement as a way to increase tax revenues.

Australia
Australia, citing COVID-19 concerns, in 2020 banned outward travel by both Australian citizens and permanent residents, unless they requested and were granted an exemption. In August 2021 this ban was extended to people who are ordinarily resident in countries other than Australia as well. Exceptions apply to business travel and travel for "compelling reasons" for three months or longer, among others.

On 1 November 2021, after 20 months, the exit permit system was scrapped and New South Wales and Victoria officially re-opened their borders in addition to ending quarantine requirements on arrival for fully vaccinated individuals. However, on 27 November 2021, 72-hour quarantine requirements were reinstated over concerns about the SARS-CoV-2 Omicron variant.

Visa restrictions

Henley & Partners

World Tourism Organization
The World Tourism Organization (UNWTO) of the United Nations has issued various Visa Openness Reports.

Non-visa restrictions

See also
 Visa fraud
 Electronic Travel Authority (Australia)
 Electronic System for Travel Authorization (US)
 Entry certificate
 List of nationalities forbidden at border
 Non-visa travel restrictions
 Travel document
 Van Der Elst visa
Commonwealth Register of Institutions and Courses for Overseas Students (Australia)

References

Further reading
 United States Department of State, "Report of the Visa Office", Visa Office, Immigrant Visa Control and Reporting Division
 United States Department of State, Nonimmigrant Visa Statistics

External links

 
 

 
Human migration